Kungajakt (English: The Royal Hunt) is a 1944 Swedish drama film directed by Alf Sjöberg.

Cast
 Inga Tidblad as Catherine von Wismar
 Holger Löwenadler as Carl Gustav von Wismar
 Lauritz Falk as Lt. Rehusen
 Erik Hell as Möllersten
 Stig Järrel as Riddercrantz
 Erik Berglund as Tarnow
 Hugo Björne as Adlerhjelm
 Björn Berglund as Lt. Manderberg
 Emil Fjellström as Nordström
 Frank Sundström as Gustaf III

References

External links
 

1944 films
1944 drama films
Swedish drama films
1940s Swedish-language films
Swedish black-and-white films
Biographical films about Swedish royalty
Films set in Sweden
Films set in the 18th century
Films directed by Alf Sjöberg
Cultural depictions of Gustav III
Films scored by Lars-Erik Larsson
1940s Swedish films